Kosmos Airlines  (Russian: КОСМОС производственное объединение, KOSMOS Proizvodstvennoe obiedinenie) is a Russian airline founded in 1995 which specialises in the delivery of cargo to launch sites.

History
 
Kosmos Airlines was founded in 1995 as Aviacompany Kosmos. In 2001 it was renamed to Kosmos Airlines. It was operating in its Russian destinations as well as having passenger and
cargo services.

Fleet

As of October 2021, the Kosmos Airlines fleet comprises the following aircraft:

Vnukovo-3 Terminal "Kosmos"

Kosmos Airlines is based at Vnukovo airport and operates an airport terminal at Vnukovo-3, called Kosmos terminal.

External links

References

Airlines of Russia
Companies based in Moscow
Airlines established in 1995
Cargo airlines of Russia
RSC Energia